John of Procida: The Bridals of Messina is an 1840 historical tragedy by the Irish writer James Sheridan Knowles. It is based on the life of the thirteenth century Italian physician and diplomat. It premiered at the Covent Garden Theatre in London.

References

Bibliography
 Nicoll, Allardyce. A History of Early Nineteenth Century Drama 1800-1850. Cambridge University Press, 1930.

1840 plays
West End plays
Biographical plays about scientists
Plays by James Sheridan Knowles
Plays set in Italy
Plays set in the 13th century